Xing Kong is a Mandarin-language television channel targeting Mainland China, currently owned by Star China Media (a subsidiary of China Media Capital). The channel was originally launched by Star in Hong Kong, but Star later sold the channel to China Media Capital. It was voted "Satellite Channel of the Year" at the 2002 China Television Programme Awards. The channel is packed with more than 700 hours of original programming each year, with content that includes drama series, music, news, cartoon, comedies, variety, lifestyle, health, food, home and living, talk and game shows. Xing Kong was similar to other Mandarin language entertainment channels like Star Chinese Channel in Taiwan (which what was named Star still operates) and Phoenix Chinese Channel (21st Century Fox sold its remaining shares in Phoenix Television in 2013).
  
Outside Mainland China, the international version of Xing Kong is currently available in Hong Kong, Macau, Malaysia,  Singapore, Indonesia, Vietnam, Middle East (United Arab Emirates, Saudi Arabia, Egypt, Qatar, Yemen, Israel, and the territories), United States, Australia and the Philippines. Xing Kong is available as free-to-view on AsiaSat 7 over the Asia-Pacific region (given that the local laws permit the use of privately owned satellite dishes).

Availability
Xing Kong is broadcast free-to-air on AsiaSat 3S (now AsiaSat 7) over the Asia-Pacific region (given that the local laws permit the use of privately owned Satellite dishes). This coverage spans from Outer Mongolia all the way to Australia and New Zealand. Although the geostationary satellite is located directly above China, private satellite tuning is prohibited in the mainland.

Citations

External links
  

Television networks in China
Cable television in Hong Kong
Television channels and stations established in 2002
Television channels and stations disestablished in 2021
2002 establishments in Hong Kong
2021 disestablishments in Hong Kong 
Former subsidiaries of The Walt Disney Company